The 2017 AFC U-16 Women's Championship qualification was a women's under-16 football competition which decided the participating teams of the 2017 AFC U-16 Women's Championship.

A total of 24 teams entered the qualification tournament, which decided four of the eight participating teams in the final tournament held in Thailand.

Draw
Of the 47 AFC member associations, a total of 27 teams entered the competition, with North Korea, Japan, China and the host nation Thailand automatically qualified for the final tournament by their position as the top four teams of the 2015 AFC U-16 Women's Championship and thus did not participate in the qualifying competition, except for Thailand which decided to also participate in the qualifying competition.

The draw for the qualifiers was held on 19 May 2016, 15:00 MYT (UTC+8), at the AFC House in Kuala Lumpur, Malaysia. The 24 teams were drawn into four groups of six teams.

The teams were seeded according to their performance in the previous season in 2015 AFC U-16 Women's Championship final tournament and qualification. The following restrictions were also applied:
The three teams which indicated their intention to serve as qualification group hosts prior to the draw were drawn into separate groups.

Notes
Teams in bold qualified for the final tournament.
(H): Qualification group hosts (remaining group hosted at neutral venue)
(Q): Automatically qualified for final tournament regardless of qualification results
(W): Withdrew after draw

Did not enter

 (suspended)

Player eligibility
Players born between 1 January 2001 and 31 December 2003 were eligible to compete in the 2017 AFC U-16 Women's Championship.

Format
In each group, teams played each other once at a centralised venue. The four group winners qualified for the final tournament. If Thailand won their group, the runner-up of their group also qualified for the final tournament.

Tiebreakers
Teams were ranked according to points (3 points for a win, 1 point for a draw, 0 points for a loss), and if tied on points, the following tiebreaking criteria were applied, in the order given, to determine the rankings (Regulations Article 11.5):
Points in head-to-head matches among tied teams;
Goal difference in head-to-head matches among tied teams;
Goals scored in head-to-head matches among tied teams;
If more than two teams are tied, and after applying all head-to-head criteria above, a subset of teams are still tied, all head-to-head criteria above are reapplied exclusively to this subset of teams;
Goal difference in all group matches;
Goals scored in all group matches;
Penalty shoot-out if only two teams are tied and they met in the last round of the group;
Disciplinary points (yellow card = 1 point, red card as a result of two yellow cards = 3 points, direct red card = 3 points, yellow card followed by direct red card = 4 points);
Drawing of lots.

Groups
The matches were scheduled for 25 August – 5 September 2016.

Group A
All matches were held in Thailand.
Times listed were UTC+7.

Group B
All matches were held in China (neutral venue host).
Times listed were UTC+8.

Group C
All matches were held in Bangladesh.
Times listed were UTC+6.

Group D
All matches were held in Vietnam.
Times listed were UTC+7.

Qualified teams
The following eight teams qualified for the final tournament.

1 Bold indicates champions for that year. Italic indicates hosts for that year.

Goalscorers

References

External links
, the-AFC.com
AFC U-16 Women's Championship 2017, stats.the-AFC.com

Qualification
2017
U-16 Women's Championship qualification
2016 in women's association football
2016 in youth association football
August 2016 sports events in Asia
September 2016 sports events in Asia